Sama (Bable: Sama de Llangréu) is the second largest parish of the city of Langreo / Llangréu , Asturies, in the north of Spain. It had 12,000 inhabitants. In the past, Sama was an important commercial and mining zone.

Notable residents

Artist Rosanna Castrillo Diaz was born in Sama in 1971.

Parishes in Langreo
Langreo

ast:Sama